Ajloun Governorate (alternative spelling Ajlun Governorate) is one of the governorates of Jordan, located north of Amman the capital of Jordan. Ajloun Governorate has the fourth highest population density in Jordan (after Irbid, Jerash, and Balqa Governorates) with a population density of 350.1 people/km2 (2012 estimate). It is bordered by Jerash Governorate from the south east and Irbid Governorate from the north and west.

Administrative divisions
Article 14 of the Administrative Divisions System of the Ministry of Interior divides Ajloun Governorate into two departments.
Capital Department: includes 50 towns and villages, with its administrative center in Ajloun.
Kofranjah Department: includes 19 towns and villages, its administrative center is in Kofranjah.

History
During the Crusades, a general of Saladin, Izz Al-Din Osama, built a fortress on Mount Ouff. The region also hosts the famous Ajlun Castle (previously called Qal'at Salah Ad-Dein). The castle was built as a garrison structure to protect Ajloun's strategic location from crusaders.

Along with Balqa and Karak governorates, Ajloun was formerly a united sanjak of the Ottoman Empire.

Climate
Ajloun is known for its high elevation, which makes it one of the coolest cities in Jordan, with an average maximum temperature during January of 8.2 degrees Celsius, and a minimum average temperature of 2.8 degrees Celsius. Snow is common during the winter.

Demographics 

The population of districts according to census results:

Economy
The governorate depends mainly on agriculture. In 2008, olive, grape and fruit farms constituted a total area of 141.4 km2 which is 34% of the area of Ajloun Governorate.

Education
There are 28 primary and secondary schools in Ajloun, most of them being public institutions, such as Ajloun University College (a public college) and Ajloun National University, a small private university.

Major villages
The most notable towns and villages in Ajloun (other than Ajloun self) are Ibbeen (Ebeen), Sakhra, Mrajjam, Rasoun, Ain Janna, Kufranji, Anjara and Al Hashimiyya.

Gallery

References

 
Governorates of Jordan